The Rajya Sabha (meaning the "Council of States") is the upper house of the Parliament of India. Sikkim elects 1 seat and it is indirectly elected by the state legislators of Sikkim, since year 1976. The number of seats, allocated to the party, are determined by the number of seats, a party possesses during nomination and the party nominates a member to be voted on. Elections in within the state legislatures are held using Single transferable vote with proportional representation.

List of all members from Sikkim 
Source:

References

External links
Rajya Sabha homepage hosted by the Indian government
Rajya Sabha FAQ page hosted by the Indian government
Nominated members list
State wise list

Sikkim
 
Sikkim-related lists